The German National Mountain Bike Championships are held annually to decide the cycling champions in the mountain biking discipline, across various categories.

Men

Cross-country

Cross-country eliminator

Marathon

E-Bike Cross-country

Downhill

Four cross

Enduro

Women

Cross-country

Cross-country eliminator

Marathon

E-Bike Cross-country

Downhill

Four cross

Enduro

See also
German National Road Race Championships
German National Time Trial Championships
German National Cyclo-cross Championships

References

Cycle races in Germany
Recurring sporting events established in 1990
1990 establishments in Switzerland
National mountain bike championships
Mountain biking events